This list of Colorado railroads identifies the variety of active, historic, and defunct railroads that operate in the U.S. State of Colorado.


Common freight carriers
BNSF Railway (BNSF)
Colorado Pacific Railroad (COPR)
Cimarron Valley Railroad (CVR)
Colorado and Wyoming Railway (CW)
Denver Rock Island Railroad (DRIR)
Great Western Railway of Colorado (GWR)
Hudson Terminal Railroad (HTR)
Kansas and Oklahoma Railroad (KO)
Keenesburg Direct Railroad (KDR)
Kyle Railroad (KYLE)
Nebraska Kansas Colorado Railway (NKCR)
Rock and Rail LLC (RRRR)
San Luis Central Railroad (SLC)
San Luis and Rio Grande Railroad (SLRG)
Union Pacific Railroad (UP)
Utah Railway (UTAH)

Historic attraction carriers
Cripple Creek and Victor Narrow Gauge Railroad 
Cumbres and Toltec Scenic Railroad
Durango and Silverton Narrow Gauge Railroad 
Fort Collins Municipal Railway
Georgetown Loop
Manitou and Pike's Peak Railway
Platte Valley Trolley (Denver Tramway Heritage Society)
Rio Grande Scenic Railroad 
Royal Gorge Route Railroad
Leadville, Colorado and Southern Railroad (The South Park)

Private freight carriers
Deseret Western Railway
MillerCoors Brewery
Rawhide Shortline

Passenger carriers

Amtrak (AMTK)
RTD Rail
Colorado San Francisco and Northern LLC.
Rockies to the Red Rocks (Rocky Mountaineer)

Defunct railroads

Electric
Arkansas Valley Railway, Light and Power Company
Boulder Electric Light and Power Company
Canon City and Cripple Creek Railroad
Colfax Electric Railway
Colorado Railway, Light and Power Company
Colorado Springs and Cripple Creek District Railway (CCD)
Colorado Springs and Interurban Railway
Colorado Springs Rapid Transit Company
Colorado Springs and Suburban Railway
Cripple Creek District Railway
Denver City Cable Railway
Denver City Traction Company
Denver City Tramway Company
Denver Consolidated Tramway Company
Denver Electric and Cable Railway
Denver, Globeville and Golden Rapid Transit Company
Denver and Inter-Mountain Railroad (D&IM, DIM)
Denver and Inter-Mountain Railway
Denver and Interurban Railroad
Denver, Lakewood and Golden Railroad
Denver and Northwestern Railway
Denver and South Platte Railway
Denver Tramway Company
Denver Tramway Extension Company
Denver Tramway Terminals Company
Durango Railway and Realty Company
Florence and Cripple Creek Railroad
Fort Collins Municipal Railway
Grand Junction Electric Railway
Grand Junction and Grand River Valley Railway
Grand River Valley Railway
Greeley and Denver Railroad
Manitou Incline Railway
Metropolitan Railway
Midland Terminal Railway
Pueblo and Suburban Traction and Lighting Company
Southern Colorado Power and Railway Company
South Denver Cable Railway
Trinidad Electric Transmission, Railway and Gas Company
West End Street Railroad

See also

Colorado
Bibliography of Colorado
Index of Colorado-related articles
Outline of Colorado
Colorado statistical areas
Geography of Colorado
History of Colorado
List of counties in Colorado
List of places in Colorado
List of mountain passes in Colorado
List of mountain peaks of Colorado
List of mountain ranges of Colorado
List of populated places in Colorado
List of census-designated places in Colorado
List of county seats in Colorado
List of forts in Colorado
List of ghost towns in Colorado
List of historic places in Colorado
List of municipalities in Colorado
List of post offices in Colorado
List of rivers of Colorado
List of protected areas of Colorado

References

External links

 
 
Colorado geography-related lists
Colorado history-related lists
Colorado transportation-related lists
Colorado railroads, List of